Shelagh F J Burrow (born 1950), is a female former diver who competed for England.

Diving career
She represented England and won a bronze medal in the 10 metres platform, at the 1970 British Commonwealth Games in Edinburgh, Scotland.

She was a member of the Hillingdon Diving School and lived in Ruislip at the time of the Games.

References

1950 births
English female divers
Commonwealth Games medallists in diving
Commonwealth Games bronze medallists for England
Divers at the 1970 British Commonwealth Games
Living people
Medallists at the 1970 British Commonwealth Games